Renasant Bank is an American regional commercial financial institution based in Tupelo, Mississippi. The bank has a market cap of greater than $1 billion and more than 190 branches in Alabama, Florida, Georgia, Mississippi and Tennessee. Renasant Bank operates under the parent company Renasant Corporation and is affiliated with Renasant Nation, a platform through which they publish blogs and shows.

History
Renasant began as The Peoples Bank and Trust Company in 1904. Throughout the 1980s and 1990s the bank grew by acquiring small local banks in Mississippi. In 2005, it acquired Heritage Bank of Decatur, Alabama, and Renasant Bancshares of Memphis, Tennessee and assumed the new Renasant Bank moniker. In 2007, Renasant acquired Capital Bank of Nashville, Tennessee. In 2010, as part of the financial crisis, it acquired the failed Crescent Bank and Trust of Jasper, Georgia and later the American Trust Bank of Roswell, Georgia, both suburban Atlanta banks. Additional acquisitions followed in the 2010s, Merchants and Farmers Bank of Kosciusko, Mississippi in 2013, Heritage Bank of the South in Albany, Georgia, in 2015, and Keyworth Bank of Johns Creek, Georgia. In the third quarter of 2018, Renasant acquired BrandBank of Lawrenceville, Georgia, adding 13 more locations.

Services offered
Renasant Bank offers checking and savings accounts, credit cards, wealth management, and digital banking services. It also offers conforming, FHA, Jumbo, VA, and USDA mortgages as well as HELOCs. For businesses, it offers treasury and corporate banking services.

Asset history

References

External links
 Renasant website

American companies established in 1904
Banks established in 1904
Banks based in Mississippi
1904 establishments in Mississippi